Vaceuchelus vangoethemi is a species of sea snail, a marine gastropod mollusk in the family Chilodontaidae.

Description
The length of the shell attains 7.6 mm.

Distribution
This marine species occurs off the Philippines.

Original description
 Poppe G.T., Tagaro S.P. & Dekker H. (2006) The Seguenziidae, Chilodontidae, Trochidae, Calliostomatidae and Solariellidae of the Philippine Islands. Visaya Supplement 2: 1–228.

References

vangoethemi
Gastropods described in 2006